Ambrosiano was a national (domestic) Italian express train which connected Rome with Milan.

Ambrosiano may also refer to:

Banco Ambrosiano, the Italian bank which collapsed in 1982
Nuovo Banco Ambrosiano, the Italian bank which replaced the Banco Ambrosiano after its collapse
Banco Ambrosiano Veneto, the bank formed in 1989 by merger of Nuovo Banco Ambrosiano and Banca Cattolica del Veneto; in 1998, the latter bank formed the Banca Intesa together with the Cassa di Risparmio delle Provincie Lombarde (Cariplo)
Premio Ambrosiano, a Group 3 flat horse race in Italy open to Thoroughbreds aged 4 years or older